This is a list of legendary creatures from Indian mythology, sorted by their classification or affiliation.

Creatures associated with animals

Invertebrates

Arthropods

Bees
 Bhramari is 'the Goddess of bees' or 'the Goddess of black bees'. She is associated with bees, hornets and wasps, which cling to her body.

Scorpions
Ájakava - a poisonous scorpion mentioned in the Rig Veda.
 Chelamma, a Scorpion Goddess, native to southern Karnataka.

Matsya

 Matsya is the first avatar of the Hindu god Vishnu in the form of a fish.
 In Hinduism, The Rainbow Fish was a fish that was as large as a whale. It ate Buddha.
 Timingila is a huge aquatic creature that can swallow whole whales in one bite.

Matsyāṅganā

 Suvannamaccha is a daughter of Tosakanth (Ravana) appearing in the Thai and other Southeast Asian versions of Ramayana. She is a mermaid princess who tries to spoil Hanuman's plans to build a bridge to Lanka but falls in love with him instead.
 Macchanu is the son of Hanuman in the Cambodian, Thai and other versions of the Ramayana, and who looked like a vanara from the waist-up but had the tail of a fish.

Frog
Bheki is the name given to a frog that symbolizes the sun on the horizon in Hindu legend.

Reptiles
Kūrma

 In Hinduism, Kurma is the second Avatar of Vishnu, in the form of a turtle.
 The World Turtle in Hindu belief is known as Akupāra, or sometimes Chukwa, a chiranjeevi.
Bedawang or Bedawang Nala is a giant turtle in Balinese mythology who brought the whole world on his back. In the creation mythology of the world, it represents a change from Antaboga. He along with two dragons support the human world. If he moves, there will be earthquakes and volcanic eruptions on earth.

Makara

 Makara appears as the vahana (vehicle) of the river goddess Ganga, Narmada and of the sea god Varuna.
 Huhu is the crocodile in the legend of Gajendra Moksha.

Sarpa

 Antaboga is the world serpent of traditional Javanese mythology. It is a derivative from the Hindu Ananta Shesha combined with Javanese animism. 
 Gogaji also known as Jahar Veer Gogga is a folk deity, worshiped in the northern states of India. He is a warrior-hero of the region, venerated as a saint and a 'snake-god'. He is worshiped as a veer amongst Hindus.
 Ketu is an Asura who has the lower parts of a snake and said to have four arms.
 Nagnechiya Maa (Nagnechi Ma, Nagnechia Ma), a snake goddess, is the kuldevi of Rathore, a Suryavanshi Rajput clan of India, as well as Brahmbhatts (who are also Vaitalik Kaumudik Bramhins), 
 Patanjali is a snake footed rishi.
 Rahu is the severed head of an asura called Svarbhānu, that swallows the sun causing eclipses. He is depicted in art as a serpent with no body riding a chariot drawn by eight black horses. 
 Vritra or Ahi is a serpent or dragon, the personification of drought and adversary of Indra.

 Nāgas

 The Naga is an entity or being, taking the form of a very great snake — specifically the king cobra. A female nāga is a nāgī or nāgiṇī. Notable nagas.
 Astika is half Brahmin and half naga, son of Manasa.
 Kaliya, a snake conquered by Krishna.
 Karkotaka controls weather
 Manasā, also Mansa Devi, is a Hindu folk goddess of snakes, sister of Vasuki and wife of sage Jagatkāru (Jaratkāru).
 Paravataksha, his sword causes earthquakes and his roar caused thunder.
 Surasa is a Hindu goddess, who is described as the mother of the nagas (serpents).
 Susna is a horned serpent-demon who aids the Asuras in their war against the Deva. The serpent also guards the essence of Amrita in its stomach. Susna is also associated with drought.
 Shesha is the nagaraja or king of all nāgas. The snake on whom Vishnu is in yoga nidra (Ananta shayana).
 Takshaka is mentioned as a King of the Nagas.
 Ulupi, a companion of Arjuna in the epic Mahabharata
 Vasuki is a nagaraja, one of the King serpents, who coils over Shiva's neck.

 Pannaga

 A race related to the Nagas and Uragas, born of Kadru, sister of Surasa.

 Uraga

 A race related to the Nagas and Pannagas, born of Kadru, sister of Surasa.

Pakshin 

 Byangoma (feminine Byangomi)  are legendary birds of Bengali mythology, appearing most notably in the fairytales of Thakurmar Jhuli, where they are portrayed as wise, fortune-telling birds that help the deserving.
 Gandabherunda (also known as the Bherunda) is a two-headed mythological bird of Hindu beliefs thought to possess magical strength.
 Homa Pakshi (a Vedic bird). It lays eggs while flying in the sky and then the egg will fall. As it is falling, a bird will hatch from the egg. The hatchling then learns how to fly without touching the earth.

 The Karura is a divine creature with human torso and birdlike head in Japanese Hindu-Buddhist faith.

Baka
Bagala - A crane-headed god in Hindu legend, Bagala controls black magic, poisons and disguised forms of death.
Krauncha - A crane mentioned in the Ramayana.
Nadijangha -  The name of a crane, who was liked by Brahma very much. His story was told by Bhishma to Dharmaraja.

Gṛdha

 Vultures who were the sons of Aruna, brother of Garuda.
 Sampati, the King of Vultures, was the oldest son of Aruṇa and a brother of Jatayu.
 Jatayu is the youngest son of Aruna, brother of Sampati.

Haṁsa

 The hamsa (Sanskrit: हंस, haṃsa or hansa) is an aquatic bird of passage, such as a goose or a swan. Its icon is used in Indian and Southeast Asian culture as a spiritual symbol and a decorative element. Hamsa is a part of the mythical love story of Nala and Damayanti. The hamsa is the vahana of Brahma & Saraswathi.
 Arayanna, or heavenly hamsa (swans), are said to live in Manasasaras in the Himalayas.

Kāka
 Chanda, a crow, is the father of Bhusunda and his twenty brothers (Bhusunda and his brothers were born from the union of Chanda and the seven swans of the Goddess Brahmi).
 Bhusunda is a very old sage, in the form of a crow. In the Story of Bhusunda, a chapter of the Yoga Vasistha, Bhusunda recalls a succession of epochs in the earth's history, as described in Hindu cosmology. He survived several destructions, living on a wish-fulfilling tree on Mount Meru.

Kukkuṭaśāva
Krichi is the rooster of Murugan, depicted on his war flag, the Seval Kodi.

Mayura

 Citramekhala is the mayura of Saraswathi, Goddess of learning and wisdom.
 Paravani is the mayura vahana of Murugan, the God of War.

Sarngika
 Jarita was a certain female bird of the species called Sarngika. She was wife of saint Mandapala.

Shuka
Suka - The parrot vahana of Kamadeva
Shuka - The parrot of Kalki

Shyena

 Shyena (Sanskrit: श्येन ) is the divine hawk identified with Agni, who ascends to heaven for bringing soma (nectar) to earth with the intention of rejuvenating and revitalizing of all things that exist on earth.

Suparna 

The Garuda is a large bird-like creature, or humanoid bird. Garuda is the mount (vahana) of the Lord Vishnu. According to the Mahabharata, Garuda had six sons from whom were descended the race of birds.
 Sumukha
 Suvarna
 Subala
 Sunaama
 Sunethra
 Suvarcha

Tittiri
 Chakora, a kind of partridge, is a legendary bird described in Hindu faiths. It is believed to reside upon the beams of the moon, that is, the Chandra. 
 Kapinjala, a partridge associated with Indra, or a form of Indra.

Uluka
 Pravirakarna - Is a chiranjeevi owl who lives in the Himalayas.
 Uluka  - The owl of Lakshmi.

Mushika 
Mushika - the rat mount of Ganesha /GANESHA is very careful about his mount Mushika and also his safety

Gaja/Hastin 

 Erawan (Thai: เอราวัณ, from Pāḷi Erāvana, or Sanskrit Airāvana) is the Thai version of Airavata. He is depicted as a huge elephant with either three or sometimes thirty-three heads which are often shown with more than two tusks.
 Gajamina Gadjamina, Gaja minah, or Eon is an elephant headed mythical figure with the body of a fish used for patulangan sarcophagi in Bali,
The Gajasimha is a mythical animal with the body of a lion and the head of an elephant. At Angkor, it is portrayed as a guardian of temples and as a mount for some warriors. 
 Gajasura is an elephant demon killed by Shiva, in his Gajasurasamhara form. 
 Gajendra the elephant, was rescued by Vishnu from the clutches of Huhu, the Crocodile in the legend of Gajendra Moksha.
 Ganesha also known as Ganapati and Vinayaka, the elephant headed God.
 Iravati is a daughter of Kadru and Kasyapa. She is the mother of Airavata, the mount of Indra. She is also associated with a sacred river.
 In a tale about Ganesha's birth, the elephant-headed demoness Malini gives birth to Ganesha after drinking the bath-water of Parvati, Ganesha's mother.
 In Hindu beliefs there were three elephants by the name Supratika. The foremost among them is listed as one of the Diggajas, each representing the eight quarters. The Hindu epic Mahabharata describes two more elephants by the same name – a mythical elephant that was an incarnation of a sage, and the one that belonged to Bhagadatta, the king of Pragjyotisha.
 Vinayaki is an elephant-headed Hindu goddess, a Matrika. The goddess is generally associated with the elephant-headed god of wisdom, Ganesha.

Diggajas

 The Amarakosha, a thesaurus of Sanskrit, mentions the names of eight male elephants, and their respective consorts, that bear the world together.
 Airavata is a mythological white elephant who carries the Hindu God Indra. He also represents the Eastern direction, the quarter of Indra. Abhramu is the consort of Airavata.
 Pundarika, carries the Hindu god Yama. He reprents the Southeast. Kapila is the consort of Pundarika.
 Vamana and his mate Pingala guard the South with an unspecified god.
 Kumunda (Southwest) and his mate Anupama, with the god Surya.
 Anjana and his mate Añjanā guards the West with the god Varuna.
 Pushpa-danta and his mate Subhadanti guards the Northwest with the god Vayu.
 Sarva-bhauma represents the North, the quarter of Kubera. His mate is Tāmrakarna.
 Supratika represents the North-east direction, the quarter of Soma. Anjanavati is believed to be the wife of Supratika.

 Four names are given in the Ramayana 1.41:
 Viru-paksha - East
 Maha-padma - South
 Saumanas - West
 Bhadra - North

Kapi 
Kapi is known to be a form of monkey, especially used to represent Hanuman as seen from Hanuman chalisa lines:- jai kapees tihu lok ujagar

Vanara

 The Vanaras are the monkey race in the Ramayana. The following are notable vanaras.
 Angada, son of Bali, helped Rama find his wife Sita
 Anjana, Hanuman's mother.
 Hanuman is a monkey God and an ardent devotee of the God Rama.
 Kesari, Hanuman's foster father.
 Makardhwaja is the son of Hanuman as per the Valmiki Ramayana.
 Nala, son of Vishwakarma.
 Nila, son of Agni.
 Rumā was the wife of Sugrīva.
 Sugriva, king of Kishkindha, son of Surya.
 Tara, wife of Bali.
 Vali, Sugriva's brother, and a son of Indra

Varāha

 Emūsha - In the Brāhmana, a boar which raised up the earth, represented as black and with a hundred arms (probably the germ of the Varaha avatara).
 Varaha is the third avatar of the Hindu god Vishnu in the form of a boar.
 Varahi is one of the Matrikas. With the head of a sow, Varahi is the consort of Varaha.

Hariṇa 
 Pashupati (Sanskrit Paśupati) is an incarnation of the Hindu god Shiva as "lord of the animals".
 Rishyasringa was a boy born with the horns of a deer in Hindu-Buddhist faiths, who became a seer.

Gō

Paśu 

 Ushas are associated with the reddish cows, and are released by Indra from the Vala cave at the beginning of time.
 Vrishabha - A cow-headed Yogini, who is considered to be the mother of Ganesha.

Kamadhenu

 Kamadhenu also known as Surabhi, is a bovine-goddess described in Hinduism as the mother of all cows. She is a miraculous "cow of plenty" who provides her owner whatever he desires and is often portrayed as the mother of other cattle as well as the eleven Rudras. The following are the offspring of Kamadhenu.
 Kapila cows (the golden cows), are the children of Kamadhenu, who were also called the mothers of the world (according to the Anushasana Parva, the thirteenth book of the Mahabharata).
 Manoratha, a calf, created by Krishna (along with its mother, Kamadhenu) from the left side of his body (according to the Devi Bhagavata Purana)
 Nandini (sometimes referred to as Sabala), the cow of Vashistha, the daughter of Indra's cow Kamadhenu.
 Rohini, daughter of Surabhi, who is said to be the mother of cows (according to the Ramayana)
 Sushila, a daughter of Kamadhenu in the Brahmanda Purana
 Yogishvari, a cow,  daughter of Kamadhenu (according to the Matsya Purana)

Dikpalis
The guardian cow goddesses of the heavenly quarters (they are the 4 daughters of Kamadhenu according to the Udyoga Parva, fifth book of the Mahabharata): 
 Dhenu in the north
 Harhsika in the south
 Saurabhi in the east 
 Subhadra in the west

Vṛṣabha 

 Bir Kuar or Birkuar, also known as Birnath, is a Hindu cattle-god worshipped by the herder-class of Ahirs of western Bihar in India. He is considered to be a form of the god, Krishna.
 Nandi, or Nandikeshvara is the name for the bull which serves as the mount of the god Shiva and as the gatekeeper of Shiva and Parvati.

Mahiṣa 

 Mahishasura; According to Hindu beliefs, Mahishasura was a combination of both an Asura and a mahisha ("water buffalo"), with a trident.
 Mahishi - The sister of Mahishasura. After the death of Mahishasura, Mahishi continued the war against Devas.
 Mhasoba, is a horned buffalo deity of pastoral tribes in Western and Southern India.
 Paundraka is the name of the buffalo of Yama.

Aja 
Aja - A "He-goat" sacred to Pushan. Holds a prominent position in death rites; it shows the path to the dead.
 Ajaikapala - A boy, whom was begotten by the grace of Shankara. He had one foot of a man and the other of a goat. He overcame death as a child and is known as 'Mrityunjya'. (see also Markandeya)
Daksha - His head was replaced by a goat's after a beheading.
Naigamesha also known as Harinegameshi, is a goat-headed or deer-headed deity (associated with the war-god Kartikeya).
Pūṣan -  a Vedic guardian of flocks and herds.

Ashva 

 The Ashvins, in Hindu belief, are two Vedic gods, divine twin horsemen in the Rigveda, sons of Saranyu, a goddess of the clouds and wife of Surya in his form as Vivasvant. They are represented as humans with the heads of horses.
 Badavā - 'A mare, the submarine fire.' In belief, it is a flame with the head of a horse, called also Haya-siras.
 Dadhi-krā is the name of a divine horse or bird, personification of the morning Sun.
 Devadatta - The white horse of Kalki.
 Gandharvi, daughter of Kamadhenu, and is the mother of horses (according to the Ramayana).
 Farasi Bahari - These are magical green Water Horses that live at the bottom of the Indian Ocean. They are depicted as a horse in its forepart, with a coiling, scaly, fish-like hindquarter.
 Hayagriva, also spelt Hayagreeva, is a horse-headed avatar of the Lord Vishnu in Hinduism.
 Keshi is the horse-demon, healed by Krishna.
 Kinnara In Hindu faith, a kinnara is a paradigmatic lover, a celestial musician, half-human and half-horse.
 Tārkṣya is the name of a mythical being in the Rigveda, described as a horse with the epithet áriṣṭa-nemi "with intact wheel-rims".
 Tumburu is a horse faced Ghandarva, a celestial musician.
 Uchchaihshravas is a seven-headed flying horse, that was obtained during the churning of the milk ocean. Uchchaihshravas is often described as a vahana ("vehicle") of Indra - the god-king of heaven, but is also recorded to be the horse of Bali, the king of demons.
 White horse (mythology) White horses appear many times in Hindu faith.

Khaḍgin

 The Karkadann (from kargadan, Persian: كرگدن "Lord of the Desert") was a mythical creature said to live on the grassy plains of India and Persia. The word kargadan also means rhinoceros in Persian and Arabic.
 Odontotyrannos ("tooth-tyrant") is a three horned beast said to have attacked Alexander the Great and his men at their camp in India.  It had a black, horse-like head, with three horns protruding from its forehead, and exceeded the size of an elephant.
 The Unicorn is a legendary creature that has been described since antiquity as a beast with a large, pointed, spiraling horn projecting from its forehead. The unicorn was depicted in ancient seals of the Indus Valley Civilization and was mentioned by the ancient Greeks in accounts of natural history by various writers, including Ctesias, Strabo, Pliny the Younger, and Aelian. The Bible also describes an animal, the re'em, which some versions translate as unicorn.

Shvan

 Ruru - a dog; one of the Bhairavas, a manifestation of Shiva.
 In Hindu faith, Sarama is a mythological being referred to as the dog of the gods, or Deva-shuni.
 Sarameya (literally, "sons of Sarama") are the children of Sarama, whose names are Shyama and Sabala.
 Sharvara is an ancient Hindu mythical dog belonging to Yama.
 Sisara is the husband of Sarama, father of the Sarameya.

Mahabidala 

 Budhi Pallien is a fearsome goddess of forests and jungles, who roams northern India, particularly Assam, in the form of a tiger. 
 Kimpurusha were described to be lion-headed beings.
 Narasiṃha is an avatar of the Hindu god Vishnu, and is often visualised as having a human torso and lower body, with a lion face and claws.
Dawon is a sacred tiger (sometimes drawn as a lion), it was offered by gods to serve goddess Durga or Parvati as mount for rewarding her victory.
 Narasimhi (Sanskrit: नारसिंहीं, Nārasiṃhī), power of Narasimha (lion-man form of Vishnu), is a woman-lion and throws the stars into disarray by shaking her lion mane.
 Manasthala is the lion vahana of Durga who was known as the asura Simhamukha in his previous life.
 Pratyangira or sometimes called Prathyangira, Narasimhi or Narashimhika, is a Hindu Goddess described with a lioness's face and a human body.
 Simhamukha is a lion faced demon, brother of Surapadman who later was transformed into the vahana of Durga due to his bravery in fighting the god, Muruga.
 Vyaghrapada, that is, one having the feet like a tiger, was one of the mythical rishis (sage) of ancient India.

Bidala 

 Mārjāra - The cat vahana of Shashthi, a Hindu folk Goddess (Shashthi is associated with the war-god Kartikeya).

Bhallūka

Riksha

 The Rikshas are described as something like Vanaras but in later versions of Ramayana, Rikshas are described as bears. Notable Rikshas are as follows:
Jambavan/Jamvanta is a character originating in Indian epic poetry. The King of the Bears, he is an Asiatic or sloth bear in Indian epic tradition.
Jambavati is the daughter of Jambavan, King of the Bears, and the third wife of Krishna.

Yuyukkhura

 The Crocotta (or corocotta, crocuta, or leucrocotta), is a mythical dog-wolf of India or Ethiopia, linked to the hyena and said to be a deadly enemy of men and dogs.

Therianthrope

 Ichchhadhari Nag or Naagin is a mythical shape-shifting cobra in Indian folklore.

Ailuranthrope
Weretiger -  In India, the weretiger is often a dangerous sorcerer, portrayed as a menace to livestock, who might at any time turn to man-eating. These tales travelled through the rest of India and into Persia through travellers who encountered the royal Bengal tigers of India and then further west.

Hemaraj - The hemaraj is a creature found in Thai and possibly South Asian(Indian) faith. It is said to be the combination of a hem (an ill-defined creature in and of itself; usually likened to a swan but sometimes depicted more like a crocodilian) and a lion.
Makara is a sea-creature in Hindu faith. Makara is the vahana (vehicle) of Ganga - the goddess of the river Ganges and the sea god Varuna. It is also the insignia of the love god Kamadeva.
In the epic Ramayana, the Makara is responsible for the birth of Lord Hanuman’s son, Makardhwaja.
Navagunjara is a creature composed of nine different animals. The beast is considered a form of the Hindu god Vishnu, or of Krishna, who is considered an Avatar (incarnation) of Vishnu.
Panchamukhi Hanuman Hanuman assumed the Panchamukhi or five-faced form to kill Ahiravana. He assumes a vanara’s head, a lion’s head, an eagle’s head, a boar’s head and a horse’s head.
Reachisey is a mythical animal, with the head of a lion, a short elephantine trunk, and the scaly body of a dragon. It occurs at Angkor Wat in the epic bas reliefs of the outer gallery.
Rompo is a mythological beast with the head of a hare, the ears of a human, a mane, a slender body, the front arms of a badger, and the rear legs of a bear. It feeds only on human corpses and it is said to croon softly as it eats.
Vaikuntha Chaturmurti or Vaikuntha Vishnu is a four-headed aspect of the Hindu god Vishnu, mostly found in Kashmir (northern part of the Indian subcontinent). He has a human head, a lion head, a boar head and a demonic head. 
Yali also known as Vyala or Vidala in Sanskrit) is a mythical creature seen in many Hindu temples, often sculpted onto the pillars. It may be portrayed as part-lion, part-elephant and part-horse, and in similar shapes
Sharabha is a part-lion and part-bird beast in Hindu mythology, who, according to Sanskrit literature, is eight-legged and more powerful than a lion or an elephant, possessing the ability to clear a valley in one jump.

Devas, Adaityas and Spirits 

Abhutarajas
A class of 10 gods of the Raivata Manvantara, the 5th. It is also called Abhutarayas.

Adyas
 One of the 5 classes of gods in the 6th Manvantara, of which Caksusa was the Manu.

Angiris

The Angiris (or Angiras) are a group of celestial beings who are descendants of the Fire God Agni and the Goddess Agnayi, and responsible for watching over humans performing Yagna (sacrifices) and protecting the sacrificial fires

Apsara

 An Apsara (also spelled as Apsarasa) is a female spirit of the clouds and waters in Hindu and Buddhist mythology. They are often wives of the Gandharvas. Notable apsarases:
Menaka
Pramlocha
Rambha
Tara
Tilottama
Urvashi
Adrika

Asura 

 The Asuras are mythological lord beings in Indian texts who compete for power with the more benevolent devas. 
 Daityas - In Hinduism, they are a clan or race of Asura as are the Danavas. Daityas were the children of Diti and the sage Kashyapa. The following are notable Daityas.
 Hiranyaksha - eldest son of Kashyapa and Diti
 Hiranyakashipu - second son of Kashyapa and Diti
 Holika or Sinhika - daughter of Kashyapa and Diti
 Prahlada - son of Hiranyakashipu
 Virochana - son of Prahlada, father of Bali
 Devamba - mother of Bali
 Bali - son of Virochana
 Banasura - son of Bali
 Danavas - In Vedic faith the Danavas were a race of Asura descending from Daksha.
 The Kalakeyas or Kalakanjas were a powerful, ferocious and cruel clan of Danavas.
 Nivatakavachas 
 The Nivatakavachas are a supernatural race of Asura demons, living deep under the oceans.

Bhuta

 Acheri is the ghost or spirit of a little girl who was either murdered or abused and left to die. 
 Aleya (or marsh ghost-light) is the name given to an unexplained strange light phenomena occurring over the marshes as observed in Bengal.
 Chir Batti, Chhir Batti or Cheer batti is a ghost light reported in the Banni grasslands, a seasonal marshy wetlands and adjoining desert of the marshy salt flats of the Rann of Kutch.

Dakini

 The dakini appeared in medieval legends in India (such as in the Bhagavata Purana, Brahma Purana, Markandeya Purana and Kathasaritsagara) as a demoness in the train of Kali who feeds on human flesh. The masculine form is known as Daka.

Gana

 The Ganas or Gana-Devatas are the troops of deities, attendants of Shiva and live on Gana-parvata i.e., Kailasa. Ganesha was chosen as their leader by Shiva, hence Ganesha's title gaṇeśa or gaṇapati, "lord or leader of the ganas". The nine classes of Ganas are:
 Adityas
 Viswe-devas
 Vasus
 Tushitas (also Ája)
 Abhaswaras; The "Shining Ones". A class of deities, 64 in number. They inhabit an ethereal world and preside over spiritual enlightenment.
 Anila
 Maharajikas; a class of subordinate deities in the order of 220 or 236.
 Sadhyas; a class of minor Hindu gods who guard the rites and prayers of the greater gods. 
 Rudras

Gandharva

 The Gandharvas are male nature spirits, husbands of the Apsaras. Some are part animal, usually a bird or horse.
Chitrasena, a character in the Indian epic Mahabharata, was a Gandharva king who taught song and dance to Arjuna.
Kabandha was a gandharva named Vishvavasu or Danu, who was cursed and made into an ugly, carnivorous demon by Indra, and was killed and liberated by Rama.
Tumburu, a well-known Gandharva.

Guhyaka

 Guhyaka(s) (गुह्यक, literally "hidden ones") is a class of supernatural beings in Hindu faith. Like Yakshas (nature-spirits), they are often described as attendants of Kubera.

Kimpurusha

 Kimpurusha were described to be lion-headed beings.

Kindeva

 Kindeva are a race of human-like beings mentioned in the Hindu Puranas. They are said to have a human-like appearance, but also deva-like qualities, hence the term kindeva.

Kinnara

In Hindu mythology and Buddhist mythology, a kinnara is a paradigmatic lover, a celestial musician, half-human, half-horse/half-bird. The  Kinnaris are the female counterpart of Kinnaras.

Kumbhanda

A Kumbhāṇḍa (Sanskrit) or Kumbhaṇḍa (Pāli) is one of a group of dwarfish, misshapen spirits among the lesser deities of Buddhist mythology.

Naga

Panis

 The Panis are a class of demons in the Rigveda. The Panis appear in RV 10.108 as watchers over stolen cows.

Pishacha

 The Pishachas are flesh-eating demons according to Hindu faith.

Preta

 Preta is the Sanskrit name for a type of supernatural being described in some Indian religions as undergoing suffering greater than that of humans, particularly an extreme level of hunger and thirst.

Rakshasa

The rakshasas are demonic beings from Hindu faith. Rakshasas are also called maneaters (Nri-chakshas, Kravyads). A female rakshasa is known as a Rakshasi.
 Brahmarakshasa are fierce demon spirits in Hindu faith.
Krodhavasas are a race of rakshasas in the Mahabharata.
 The following are notable rakshasas:
 Akshayakumara was the youngest son of Ravana.
 Atikaya was the son of Ravana and his wife Danyamalini'' in the Ramayana epic.
 Hidimba is the brother of Hidimbi and a forest dweller.
 Hidimbi is the wife of Bhima and mother of Ghatotkacha in the Mahābhārata.
 Indrajit or Meghanada was a prince of Lanka and a conqueror of Indra Loka. He is the son of king Ravana.
 Kumbhakarna is the third brother of Ravana.
 Mandodari was the queen consort of Ravana.
 Maricha is the uncle of Ravana, who aided in the abduction of Sita.
 Nikumbha is the Lord of the Pisachas, son of Kumbhakarna.
 Prahasta is the chief commander of Ravana's army of Lanka and son of Ravana.
 Ravana, king of Lanka, brother of Kubera.
 Shurpanakha  is the youngest sister of Ravana, King of Lanka.
 Subahu,son of Tataka.
 Tataka,mother of Subahu
 Vibhishana is the second brother of Ravana.

Riksha

Suparna

Vanara

Vetala

 Chedipe is a witch-vampire in the folklore of the region around the Godavari River in India. They are associated with the devadasis, girls who were dedicated to a Hindu temple god and were often treated as temple prostitutes.
 Churel is a female ghost of South Asian folklore. The word "churel" is also used colloquially for a witch. Women who die in childbirth or pregnancy due to the negligence of her in laws or relatives are often described turning into churels, who return to seek their vendetta and suck the blood of their male relatives.
 Pichal Peri (Persian: پیچھل‌ پری) or churail (Urdu: چڑیل) (meaning back footed in Urdu language) is an unexplained entity that is a popular topic for ghost stories in Central and South Asia.

Vidyadhara

 Vidyadhara are a group of supernatural beings in Indian religions who possess magical powers.  They are considered as Upadevas, semi- gods, and essentially spirits of the air. A female Vidyadhara is known as a Vidyadhari.

Vinayakas

The Vinayakas were a group of four troublesome demons who created obstacles and difficulties in Hindu faith, but who were easily propitiated.

Yaksha

 Yaksha is the name of a broad class of nature-spirits, usually benevolent, who are caretakers of the natural treasures hidden in the earth and tree roots. They appear in Hindu, Jain and Buddhist texts. The feminine form of the word is yakṣī.
Kubera, king of the Yakshas.
Manibhadra
Nalakuvara

Yakshini

 Yakshini (Yakshi) is the female counterpart of the male Yaksha, and they are attendees of Kubera. Although Yakshinis are usually benevolent, there are also yakshinis with malevolent characteristics in Indian folklore.
 Kalliyankattu Neeli, a powerful demoness who was finally destroyed by Suryakaladi nambudiri.
 Kanjirottu Yakshi (Chiruthevi) is a folkloric vampire. She was born into an affluent Padamangalam Nair tharavad by name Mangalathu at Kanjiracode in Southern Travancore (now in Tamil Nadu). She was a ravishingly beautiful courtesan who had an intimate relationship with Raman Thampi, son of King Rama Varma.
 Tatakā or Taraka (ताड़का) was a Yaksha princess-turned-demoness in the epic Ramayana.

Yogini

 In Sanskrit literature, the yoginis have been represented as the attendants or various manifestations of Durga engaged in fighting with the demons Shumbha and Nishumbha, and the principal yoginis are identified with the Matrikas. There are sixty-four or eighty-one Yoginis (Tantric goddesses).

Others

 Chiranjivi are seven immortal living beings in Hinduism who are to remain alive on Earth until the end of the current Kali Yuga.
 Dvarapala is a door or gate guardian often portrayed as a warrior or fearsome giant, usually armed with a weapon - the most common being the gadha mace.
 Nairrata are demon soldiers of Kubera's army, described to have defeated king Mucukunda.
 Vālakhilyas were great sages, 60,000 in number, born of the parents Kratu and Kriyādevī. They were of the size of a thumb.
 Vishnuduta are the messengers of Vishnu.
 Yamaduta are the messengers of Death.

Human races

 The Astomi are an ancient legendary race of people who had no need to eat or drink anything at all. They survived by smelling apples and flowers. Megasthenes and Pliny the Elder (quoting Megasthenes) mentioned these people in his Indica. Megasthenes located them at the mouth of the river Ganges.
 The Calingae or Calingi, according to ancient accounts, were a race of extremely short-lived people in India. According to Pliny the Elder they had a lifespan of only eight years. 
 The Deva are a mythical people of Sri Lanka according to the Sanskrit epics. According to the Mahavamsa and Ramayana they lived among the Naga, Yakkha and Raskha. They ousted their arch enemies the Raskha from Sri Lanka, with the help of Lord Vishnu. They were then subsequently conquered by King Ravana of the Raskha.
 Eka-pāda 'One-footed' A fabulous race of men spoken of in the puranas.
 The Macrocephali in Medieval bestiaries were a race of humanoids with large heads. Some sources indicate that they may have come from India.
 Mandi, The Mandi, according to Pliny the Elder, are a short-lived people from India.
 Monopods are mythological human creatures with a single, large foot extending from a leg centered in the middle of their bodies. They are described by Pliny the Elder in his Natural History, where he reports travelers' stories from encounters or sightings of Monopods in India. Pliny remarks that they are first mentioned by Ctesias in his book Indika (India).

Monsters

 Ihamrga is the representation of fabulous creatures in Hindu faith.
 Kala is a ferocious monster symbolic of time in its all-devouring aspect and associated with the destructive side of the god Shiva.
 Kirtimukha is the name of a swallowing fierce monster face with huge fangs, and gaping mouth, quite common in the iconography of Indian and Southeast Asian temple architecture.

See also
 List of legendary creatures by type
 List of mythical creatures

References

 
Hindu mythology
legendary